The tepui vireo (Vireo sclateri) is a species of bird in the family Vireonidae.

It is found in the tepui highlands of southern Venezuela and adjacent parts of western Guyana and northern Brazil. Its natural habitat is subtropical or tropical moist montane forest between 600 and 2,000 meters elevation.

References

tepui vireo
Birds of the Tepuis
tepui vireo
tepui vireo
tepui vireo
Taxonomy articles created by Polbot